John Dominic Burns is a Judge of the Supreme Court of the Australian Capital Territory and a former Chief Magistrate of the Australian Capital Territory.

Career 

Burns was admitted to practice in 1981. He first worked at Legal Aid NSW. 
In 1983, Burns moved to Canberra and worked for the Deputy Crown Solicitors Office as a prosecutor.

The following year he joined the Australian Government Solicitor.

Burns then joined the firm Gallens Barristers and Solicitors in 1985 and shortly became a partner.

He was called to the bar in 1989 and joined Blackburn Chambers.

In 1990, Burns was appointed a Magistrate of the Australian Capital Territory and a Magistrate of the Norfolk Island Territory.

After the retirement of Ron Cahill, Burns was appointed Chief Magistrate of the Australian Capital Territory on 15 December 2009.

In July 2011, it was announced that Burns would be appointed to the Supreme Court. He was appointed a Judge of the Supreme Court on 1 August 2011.

Burns currently serves on the ACT Law Reform Advisory Committee.

References 

Judges of the Supreme Court of the Australian Capital Territory
21st-century Australian judges
Magistrates of the Magistrates Court of the Australian Capital Territory
Living people
Year of birth missing (living people)
Australian magistrates